Michael "Mikey" Please (born 1984) is a BAFTA-winning and Academy Award nominated English animator, director, illustrator, and writer.

Biography 
An alumnus of the Royal College of Art (MA Animation) and the University of the Arts London (BA Technical Arts and Special Effects), Please has made several music videos and short films including his BAFTA winning (2011: Best Short Animation) RCA graduation film, The Eagleman Stag. In 2014 Please co-founded East London-based Parabella Animation Studio alongside fellow RCA graduate Dan Ojari.

He also worked as episode director for Cartoon Network's Elliott from Earth and co-writer and director of Aardman Animations stop motion special Robin Robin for Netflix. He is a member of the Academy of Motion Picture Arts and Sciences.

Short films

The Eagleman Stag (2010) 
The Eagleman Stag, follows an entomologist as he contemplates the nature of time and possibility of eternal life. After premiering at The Sundance Film Festival The Eagleman Stag went on to win the BAFTA for Best Animated Short in 2011. During its festival run the film picked up a further 23 international awards, was Film of the Year on Short of the Week and eventually shortlisted for an Academy Award.

Marilyn Myller (2014) 
His following film Marilyn Myller, followed a sculptor struggling with the expectation of making art and the disappointing reality. The film was developed during a 3 month artist’s residency at Japic (Japan), and co-produced by Blink Ink in London & Hornet Inc in New York. Marilyn Myller premiered at Sundance in 2014 and won Best of Fest at Melbourne International Film Festival, Best short film at the British Animation Awards, Best of British Animation at Encounters Film Festival, Special Jury Prize at the Chicago international Film festival and the McLaren Award for Best British Animation at the Edinburgh International Film Festival.

Other shorts include The Jolly Dot, Goodness Newness Oldness Badness, Glens Gloves, Crone and Spectacular View.

Music videos 
Please has directed several music videos for music artists such as Jeffrey Lewis (2008), M Ward, (2008) and Ingrid Michaelson (2009) as well as illustrating album art.

In 2010 he was approached by TV on the Radio to direct the video for Second Song, a segment of their album length film - ‘9 Types of Light’, which was later nominated for a Grammy Award.  In 2018 he co-directed (with Dan Ojari) the opening and closing segment for Kamasi Washington’s album length film ‘As told to G/D thyself’  which premiered at the Sundance Film Festival in 2019 and was nominated for an MVA.

Long Form

Zero Greg (2014) 
Please was commissioned by Film 4 to write and develop a family animated feature, produced by Mary Burke for Warp Films. The script, entitled ‘Zero Greg’, featured a young boy unaffected by Gravity.

Alan the Infinite (2019) 
Please & Ojari produced, wrote and directed an 11 minute stopmotion TV pilot about an intern at a lamination company who discovers the 'infinity particle'. The project was a co-production between Parabella and Blink Industries.

Elliott from Earth (2020) 
Please joined Cartoon Network in 2019 as Episode Director on Elliot From Earth (16 x 11min episodes).

Robin Robin (2021) 
In 2019, Netflix commissioned a 30 minute stopmotion special, co-written and directed by Please and Ojari, and produced by Aardman Animations about a young bird raised by a family of burglar mice. The film, Robin Robin was released in 2021. It was nominated for an Academy Award for Best Animated Short. A picture book written by Please and Ojari and illustrated by Briony May Smith, will accompany the release, published by Macmillian.

References

External links 
 
 Parabella Animation Studio


1984 births
Living people
Alumni of the Royal College of Art
BAFTA winners (people)
English animators
Date of birth missing (living people)
Place of birth missing (living people)
English illustrators